Mark W. Koran (born April 1, 1964) is an American politician and member of the Minnesota Senate. A member of the Republican Party of Minnesota, he represents District 32 in eastern Minnesota.

Early life, education, and career
Koran was born on April 1, 1964, in Saint Paul, Minnesota and raised in Saint Paul's Frogtown neighborhood. He graduated from Como High School in 1982. Koran was previously a manager for the Minnesota Department of Revenue. He is a sales manager and a member of the Lent Township Planning Commission.

Minnesota Senate
Koran was elected to the Minnesota Senate in 2016 and reelected in 2020 and 2022.

Personal life
Koran and his wife, Cindy, have three children and reside in North Branch.

References

External links

 Official Senate website
 Official campaign website

1964 births
Living people
Republican Party Minnesota state senators
21st-century American politicians
Politicians from Saint Paul, Minnesota
People from North Branch, Minnesota